Sam Parsons (born June 18, 1994 in Wilmington, Delaware) is a German-American distance runner. He competes in events ranging from the 1500 meters to the 10,000 meters. He attended Tatnall School of Wilmington, Delaware and later competed on the collegiate level at North Carolina State University.

Career

High school 
Parsons was coached by Patrick Castagno and competed in running all 12 seasons. Parsons raced a personal best of 1:58 in the 800 meters, 4:12 in the Mile, 9:00 in the 3200 meters, and 14:47 in 5000 meters at New Balance Indoor Nationals. Parsons also individually qualified for Nike Cross Nationals as a senior. Parsons led his team to multiple state championships including winning all races in a single season in 2012 by winning the Cross Country, Indoor track, and Outdoor track state championships.

College

Parsons ran for Rollie Geiger at North Carolina State. He achieved personal bests of 3:44 in the 1500 meters, 13:52 in the 5000 meters, and 28:43 in the 10,000 meters. In cross country, Parsons was a four-time participant at the NCAA Cross Country Championship placing as high as 51st during his final cross country season at the 2016 NCAA Men's Division I Cross Country Championships with a time of 30:33 for 10,000 meters.

Professional 

Parsons traveled to Germany to visit his mother’s native country. Parsons was hesitant to continue in track but decided to turn pro. In 2018, Parsons signed a three year deal with Adidas and teamed with Drew Hunter to start the professional running team, Tinman Elite. Competing under Tom “Tinman” Schwartz, Parsons posted personal bests of 3:38 in the 1500 meters, 3:58 in the Mile, 7:49 in the 3000 meters, and 13:29 in the 5K. In February 2019, Parsons acquired German citizenship in an attempt to qualify for the 2020 Summer Olympics in the 5000 metres. At the Payton Jordan Invitational (April 2019) Parsons ran with two of his teammates (Drew Hunter and Jordan Gusman) in an attempt to meet the IAAF World Track & Field Championships qualifying standard (13:22.5) in the 5,000m run. Parsons ran 13:22.32; right behind his teammates who ran 13:21. He competed in the men's 5000 metres event at the 2019 World Athletics Championships held in Doha, Qatar. He did not advance to the final.

In April of 2022 Parsons became the first person to break 4 minutes in the mile on Delaware soil.

References

1994 births
Living people
German national athletics champions
German male long-distance runners
German people of American descent
Citizens of Germany through descent
American people of German descent
Track and field athletes from North Carolina
North Carolina State University alumni
NC State Wolfpack men's track and field athletes
Sportspeople from North Carolina
American male long-distance runners
World Athletics Championships athletes for Germany